Australia competed at the 2014 Summer Youth Olympics, in Nanjing, China from 16 August to 28 August 2014.

Medalists
Medals awarded to participants of mixed-NOC (Combined) teams are represented in italics. These medals are not counted towards the individual NOC medal tally.

Archery

Australia qualified two archers from its performance at the Oceania Continental Qualification Tournament.

Individual

Team

Athletics

Australia qualified 20 athletes.

Qualification Legend: Q=Final A (medal); qB=Final B (non-medal); qC=Final C (non-medal); qD=Final D (non-medal); qE=Final E (non-medal)

Boys
Track & road events

Field Events

Girls
Track & road events

Field events

Badminton

Australia qualified two athletes based on the 2 May 2014 BWF Junior World Rankings.

Singles

Doubles

Beach Volleyball

Australia qualified a girls' team by their performance at the AVC Qualification Tournament.

Boxing

Australia qualified two boxers based on its performance at the 2014 AIBA Youth World Championships

Boys

Girls

Canoeing

Australia qualified one boat based on its performance at the 2013 World Junior Canoe Sprint and Slalom Championships.

Boys

Equestrian

Australia qualified a rider.

Fencing

Australia qualified one athlete based on its performance at the 2014 Cadet World Championships.

Boys

Mixed Team

Field Hockey

Australia qualified a boys' team based on its performance at the Oceania Qualification Tournament.

Boys' Tournament

Roster

 Matthew Bird
 Jonathan Bretherton
 Max Hendry
 Tom Howard
 Max Hughes
 Alec Rasmussen
 Nathanael Stewart
 Mackenzie Warne
 Corey Weyer

Group Stage

Quarterfinal

Semifinal

Gold medal match

Golf

Australia qualified one team of two athletes based on the 8 June 2014 IGF Combined World Amateur Golf Rankings.

Individual

Team

Gymnastics

Artistic Gymnastics

Australia qualified one athlete based on its performance at the 2014 Oceania Artistic Gymnastics Championships.

Boys

Rhythmic Gymnastics

Australia qualified one athlete based on its performance at the Oceania Qualifying Event.

Individual

Trampoline

Australia qualified one athlete based on its performance at the 2014 Oceania Trampoline Championships.

Judo

Australia qualified two athletes based on its performance at the 2013 Cadet World Judo Championships.

Individual

Team

Modern Pentathlon

Australia qualified two athletes based on its performance at the Asian and Oceania YOG Qualifiers.

Rowing

Australia qualified two boats based on its performance at the 2013 World Rowing Junior Championships.

Qualification Legend: FA=Final A (medal); FB=Final B (non-medal); FC=Final C (non-medal); FD=Final D (non-medal); SA/B=Semifinals A/B; SC/D=Semifinals C/D; R=Repechage

Rugby Sevens

Australia qualified a girls' team based on its performance at the 2013 Rugby World Cup Sevens.

Girls' Tournament

Roster

 Brooke Anderson
 Marioulla Belessis
 Shenae Ciesiolka
 Dominique du Toit
 Kellie-Marie Gibson
 Raecene McGregor
 Caitlin Morgan
 Tiana Penitani
 Amber Pilley
 Mackenzie Sadler
 Tayla Stanford
 Laura Waldie

Group Stage

Semifinal

Gold Medal Match

Sailing

Australia qualified two boats based on its performance at the Byte CII Oceania Continental Qualifiers.

Shooting

Australia qualified four shooters based on its performance at the 2013 Oceania Shooting Championships.

Individual

Team

Swimming

Australia qualified eight swimmers.

Boys

Girls

Mixed

Table Tennis

Australia qualified two athletes based on its performance at the Oceania Qualification Event.

Singles

Team

Qualification Legend: Q=Main Bracket (medal); qB=Consolation Bracket (non-medal)

Tennis

Australia qualified four athletes based on the 9 June 2014 ITF World Junior Rankings.

Singles

Doubles

Triathlon

Australia qualified two athletes based on its performance at the 2014 Oceania Youth Olympic Games Qualifier.

Individual

Relay

Weightlifting

Australia qualified 1 quota in the boys' and girls' events based on the team ranking after the 2014 Weightlifting Oceania Championships.

Boys

Girls

Wrestling

Australia qualified one athlete based on its performance at the 2014 Oceania Cadet Championships.

Key:
  - Victory by Fall.
  - Decision by Points - the loser with technical points.
  - Decision by Points - the loser without technical points.

Boys

References

2014 in Australian sport
Nations at the 2014 Summer Youth Olympics
Australia at the Youth Olympics